Adramelech: Book of Angels Volume 22 is the second album by Zion80, a musical ensemble led by guitarist Jon Madof, which was released in 2014 on John Zorn's Tzadik Records. It is part of the Zorn's Book of Angels Series, a songbook of Zorn compositions performed by a wide range of performers.

Reception

PopMatters' writer Sean Murphy stated "this is not merely a more-is-more celebration of Zorn with Madof at the helm. Rather, it taps into what is most special—and rewarding—about the Radical Jewish Culture that Zorn has been curating at his Tzadik label: music that spans time (we’re talking centuries) and crosses cultures, yet somehow, in ways that are both delirious and delightful, is totally of the here and now. It’s cutting edge history, made by musicians who know and respect tradition, but are dissatisfied with labels and the limitations of genre. ...There’s nothing not to recommend about this release, it is further evidence that virtually everything Madof touches turns to sonic gold. The album is stellar from start to finish but picks up steam as it goes along."

Track listing 
All compositions by John Zorn.

 "Araziel" - 7:15
 "Sheviel" - 5:49
 "Metatron" - 9:06
 "Shamdan" - 7:17
 "Kenunit" - 10:37
 "Caila" - 4:22
 "Lelahiah" - 6:01
 "Nehinah" - 5:56

Personnel 
 Jon Madof – guitar
 Frank London – trumpet
 Matt Darriau – alto saxophone, kaval, clarinet
 Greg Wall – tenor saxophone
 Jessica Lurie – baritone saxophone, flute
 Zach Mayer – baritone saxophone
 Brian Marsella – keyboards
 Yoshie Fruchter – guitar
 Shanir Ezra Blumenkranz – bass
 Marlon Sobol – percussion
 Yuval Lion – drums
 Mauro Refosco - percussion (track 7)

References

External links 
 Adramelech on Masada World

2014 albums
Tzadik Records albums
Jon Madof albums
Book of Angels albums